Perimeceta is a genus of moths of the family Crambidae.

Species
Perimeceta incrustalis (Snellen, 1895)
Perimeceta leucoselene (Hampson, 1919)
Perimeceta leucosticta (Hampson, 1919)
Perimeceta niphotypa Turner, 1915

References

Natural History Museum Lepidoptera genus database

Crambidae genera
Taxa named by Alfred Jefferis Turner